Agelena tenerifensis is a spider species found in the Canary Islands.

See also 
 List of Agelenidae species

External links 

tenerifensis
Spiders of the Canary Islands
Spiders described in 1992